Sissel Kyrkjebø (born 24 June 1969), also simply known as Sissel, is a Norwegian soprano.

Sissel is considered one of the world's top crossover sopranos. Her musical style ranges from pop recordings and folk songs, to classical vocals and operatic arias. She sings mainly in English and Norwegian and has also sung songs in Spanish, Swedish, Danish, Irish, Italian, French, Russian, Icelandic, Faroese, German, Neapolitan, Māori, Japanese and Latin.

She rose to prominence in Norway in the late 1980s and early 1990s, and her cover version of Ole Paus' song "Innerst i sjelen" gained wide popularity in the 1990s. She is well known for singing the Olympic Hymn (Hymne Olympique) at the opening and closing ceremonies of the 1994 Winter Olympics in Lillehammer, Norway; for duets with Plácido Domingo and Charles Aznavour at the "Christmas in Vienna" concert of 1994, José Carreras, Andrea Bocelli, Bryn Terfel, Josh Groban, Neil Sedaka, Mario Frangoulis, Russell Watson, Brian May, Tommy Körberg, Diana Krall, Warren G, Dee Dee Bridgewater and The Chieftains; and her participation on the Titanic film soundtrack.

Sissel received her first U.S. Grammy nominations on 6 December 2007 for a collaboration with the Mormon Tabernacle Choir. Spirit of the Season, a collection of songs from the choir's 2006 Christmas concert at Temple Square, was nominated for the Best Classical Crossover Album of the Year, as well as Best Engineered Classical Album.

Sissel's combined solo record sales (not including soundtracks and other albums to which she contributed) amount to 10 million albums sold, most of them in Norway, a country with 5 million people. Her albums have also sold well in Sweden, Denmark and Japan. Together with Odd Nordstoga, they are the only Norwegian artists to have an album go 11 times platinum in album sales for Strålande jul (Glorious Christmas).

In Norway she is mostly known as Sissel Kyrkjebø; she started using her first name mononymously abroad later in her career. Her first name 'Sissel' is a Norwegian variant of 'Cecilia'. This is a popular first name from Saint Cecilia, the patron saint of church music. Her last name means "church farm" or "church field", and may be derived from an agricultural property owned by or located near the local church.

Early life
Sissel grew up on Lønborg in Bergen with two older brothers, Eirik and Bjørn. Sissel and her parents often took hikes in the mountains surrounding Bergen. In early years she wanted to be a nurse, but at the age of nine music became her passion.

She joined her first children's choir under the direction of New Zealand-born conductor Felicity Laurence. She stayed with the choir for seven years and said, "That was my musical education. We sang everything: classical and jazz, folk and even Māori songs. People said we sounded like an angel choir because we had this very clean pure sound, almost like an English boys' choir."

Sissel won her first local talent competition when she was ten. She was influenced by various musical genres; her parents were interested in country music and classical music, and her brothers' interest in rock music also influenced her. She has stated that Barbra Streisand, Kathleen Battle and Kate Bush were inspirations.

Career

1983–1985: First TV appearances, Syng med oss
In 1980, she appeared in the sing-along program  ('Sing with Us') together with a children's choir. Her first solo appearance was in 1984, when she sang the Norwegian folktune "Ung Åslaug". Sissel performed in this program many times until 1989. Her first solo TV appearance without the choir was in 1983 on Norwegian TV, with the song "Evergreen" in the children's program . Later same year she and Rune Larsen, her later manager guested the TV-program   ('Do You Remember?'), hosted by Odd Grythe. She performed ""  ('Childhood Home') and "Sukiyaki".

She first sang "Å, Vestland, Vestland" on Syng med oss in 1985; it has been her signature song since then.

1986–1994: Rise to prominence in Norway, Sissel, Soria Moria and Innerst i Sjelen

In January 1986, Sissel appeared on the Norwegian TV-show "Kanal 1", hosted by Ivar Dyrhaug. She performed "You Don't Bring Me Flowers" by Barbra Streisand and later, in February she performed "Comin' In and Out of Your Life" on the 1986 Alpine Skiing World Cup TV-show in Norway. In May, Sissel performed "Bergensiana" during the intermission of the Eurovision Song Contest 1986, which took place in Grieg Hall in her home town of Bergen. That was her big breakthrough and same year, her first album, Sissel, was released. It sold more than 500,000 copies, making it the best selling album in Norway at that time.

In 1987, Sissel made her debut on Danish television, on Under Uret, hosted by Hans Otto Bisgaard. She performed two songs: "Vårvise" with Danish singer/composer Sebastian and "Summertime". Later that year, in November Sissel released her Christmas album Glade Jul. It contained several traditional Christmas carols and it broke her previous record for best-selling album in Norway. This album still holds the record. Upon its release, it sold more than 600,000 copies in a country with a population of less than five million: to date, it has sold approximately 1 million copies. In Sweden, a Swedish language version was released, called Stilla Natt. Norwegian newspaper Dagbladet honored her as "The Name of the Year" in December. That year Sissel also was invited to represent Norway in the Eurovision Song Contest 1987, but she declined.

This year Sissel wanted a break from her music career and attended a commercial upper-secondary school in Bergen. She performed at the memorial concert of singer/songwriter Trygve Henrik Hoff in Tromsø, in February. Hoff wrote several of the songs on Sissel's debut album, Sissel from 1986. Hoff died in 1987. In the fall of 1988, Sissel moved to Oslo for a short period to play the role of Maria von Trapp in the Norwegian version of The Sound of Music. This production set box office records and was seen by over 110,000 people.

In 1989, she released her third album, Soria Moria. The album sold 180,000 copies. In the summer of the same year, Sissel travelled to the US and performed in New York City on the TV program Artists for Our Common Future, which was broadcast around the world. She performed "Summertime" and "Somewhere".
On a Swedish TV-concert recorded in Gothenburg she met Danish comedian and singer Eddie Skoller, whom she later married. They sang "Vårvise" by Sebastian.

In 1990, Sissel recorded the singing parts of the character Princess Ariel for the Danish, Norwegian and Swedish versions of the 1989 Disney movie The Little Mermaid, and played the voice role of Ariel in the Norwegian and Swedish versions. In the same year Sissel visited The Faeroe Islands developing a project called "Kystland". It resulted in two TV programs, Med Sissel til Kirkjubø and the church concert Tidin rennur.

In December 1990, Sissel opened the new concert hall in Oslo, Oslo Spectrum at the Christmas-concert "Å gi er å se".

In 1991, Sissel toured Norway and Denmark with her very successful church concert, Tidin rennur. In the fall of 1991, Sissel met and performed with Neil Sedaka on the Norwegian TV-show Momarkedet. Sissel sang his song "Solitaire" while Sedaka played on the piano. He was very impressed and they collaborated on her next album, Gift of Love which came out in 1992. Sissel sings three songs written by Sedaka, including a duet on "Breaking Up Is Hard To Do".

In the winter of 1992, Sissel was named one of the official musicians of the upcoming 1994 Winter Olympic Games in Lillehammer, Norway. She made a short appearance at the closing ceremony of the Olympics in Albertville, France. Dressed like a princess sitting on a giant fake polar bear like in the Norwegian folktale Kvitebjørn kong Valemon, she performed "Molde Canticle" by Jan Garbarek. Her album Gift of Love was released in October, and the album sold only 60,000 copies. It received criticism for her new style on the album. Sissel joined Neil Sedaka on his fall tour in Norway same year, and she also had several event performances in the U.S.

In the summer of 1993, Sissel played the role of Solveig in Peer Gynt by Henrik Ibsen at Den Nationale Scene in Bergen. This was very well received by critics. Later, in August Sissel married Eddie Skoller in St Mary's Church, Bergen in Bergen. Thousands of fans waited in the rain outside the church to get a glimpse of Sissel after the wedding-ceremony. The wedding received a great deal of attention from Norwegian and Danish press.

In February 1994, Sissel performed during the opening and closing ceremonies of the 1994 Winter Olympics in Lillehammer. During the Olympics, legendary Spanish tenor Plácido Domingo visited Norway, where he came across one of her earlier albums. He contacted Sissel and the next day they recorded "Fire in Your Heart", an English version of "Se ilden lyse", the official theme song of the Lillehammer Olympics. These two versions of the song were released in February 1994 on Sissel's solo album Innerst i sjelen (Deep Within My Soul), a collection of Nordic folk songs. Domingo invited Sissel, along with world-renowned French singer Charles Aznavour, to take part in his annual Christmas in Vienna concert later that year. The concert was broadcast around the world and released as an album internationally.

1995–2001: Climb to international recognition, All Good Things and In Symphony
In 1995, Sissel was invited to perform at the 1995 Live For Peace – Royal Gala in London. In celebration of 50 years V.E. Day she performed in front of Charles, Prince of Wales, in London Coliseum. She sang the renowned aria O Mio Babbino Caro from the opera Gianni Schicchi by Giacomo Puccini and the Norwegian classic Vitae Lux with the choir Gli Scapoli.

In 1997, Sissel toured the US with the Irish group The Chieftains. They appeared, among other places, on the Late Show with David Letterman and in Carnegie Hall. Later that summer, Sissel was involved in recording the soundtrack to the film Titanic. The soundtrack, called Titanic: Music from the Motion Picture, became immensely popular, reaching No. 1 on the Billboard charts and selling more than 30 million copies worldwide. James Horner, the composer of the film's music, knew Sissel from her album Innerst i sjelen and he particularly liked how she sang Eg veit i himmerik ei borg (I Know in Heaven There Is a Castle). Horner had tried 25 or 30 singers before deciding on Sissel. She was then scheduled to record the theme song to James Cameron's 1997 blockbuster film Titanic, but Celine Dion's vocals were preferred due to James Horner's decision to support Dion's career. In an interview from December 2014, Horner quotes: "When I had completed the Titanic [movie], I had to decide for Celine Dion or Sissel['s] [vocals]. Sissel I am very close, while Celine I had known since she was 18, and I had already written three film songs for [her]. But that was before Celine was known and filmmakers and marketing people had not done what they should have done for Celine and [her] songs. So I felt I owed her a Titanic chance, but I could [still] have used Sissel there." Instead, Kyrkjebø completed much of the film score for the soundtrack album.

Sissel had a No.1 hit across Europe in 1998 with Prince Igor, a duet with an American rapper Warren G on the concept album The Rapsody Overture which combined American rappers with European opera singers. Sissel sang an aria from Alexander Borodin's opera Prince Igor during the chorus, while Warren G rapped. When the song was recorded, Sissel had just a half-hour to learn the Russian lyrics and she got help from a Russian, who drove a cab in New York City: the driver's name, coincidentally, was Igor. Sissel was on her way to the airport, but the taxi-driver drove her direct to the studio and followed Sissel into studio. He helped Sissel sing the Russian words correctly while Sissel recorded her part of the lyrics. In the end, he was satisfied and they made it to the airport afterwards. On St. Patrick's Day that year, Sissel made her second performance on the Late Show, singing "Love Will You Marry Me?" with The Chieftains.

In 1999, Sissel started working on a new album with producer Rick Chertoff, and travelled between Copenhagen and New York. The CD was to be released in 2000, but Sissel was unhappy with the results of the recording sessions and scrapped the album. That year she sang the Gaelic song Siúil A Rún on The Chieftains' 1999 album Tears of Stone.

The beginning of 2000 marked Bergen as the "European city of culture", and Sissel performed at the opening ceremony. In May, as a part of Bergen's Nattjazz Festival she performed at a concert where she sang several duets with jazz singer Diana Krall. In November 2000, Sissel released (in Norway only) her album, All Good Things, which was her first solo album in nearly seven years. Following high sales, 300,000 copies sold, the album was released throughout Europe and Asia the following year. The album included the duet "Where the Lost Ones Go" with fellow Norwegian singer Espen Lind, which was also released on his album This Is Pop Music in 2001. Sissel performed Christmas carols and a few of her new tunes at the Festival of Lights (Lysfest) in Bergen in the beginning of December, culminating the city's celebration of being the cultural city of Europe. The concert was broadcast live on the Internet. Later the same month, she was invited to represent Norway at the Nobel Peace Prize Concert, where she sang "One Day" and "Weightless", both songs from All Good Things. She was introduced by Jane Seymour as "the Norwegian star Sissel." Sissel also released a greatest hits collection in Japan that included two new songs, in collaboration with Gheorghe Zamfir. These songs were used in the Japanese TV show Summer Snow, one of which was the show's theme song. Sissel is enormously popular in Japan and has released several Japanese versions of her albums there.

In 2001, she was asked to sing a duet with the Danish goth rockers Sort Sol. Sissel sang with them on the track "Elia Rising" from their album Snakecharmer, released in May 2001. Sissel was inspired by the Kylie Minogue/Nick Cave-ballad "Where the Wild Roses Grow". Sort Sol and Sissel performed both in Tivoli and at Roskilde Festival that year. At the Roskilde, they performed at 2 in the morning for a raucous audience of 50,000 rock fans. Sissel made her debut on the big screen in June, playing a female lumberjack, Inga, in the Danish children's film, Flyvende farmor (Flying Grandma). In this movie, Sissel sings the Danish song "Himlen over Himmelbjerget". In September, Sissel played two "In Symphony" concerts in Drammen, Norway, with the Norwegian Radio Orchestra and special guests. The concert was broadcast in Sweden, Norway and Denmark and was also released as a live CD, Sissel in Symphony, which sold 240,000 copies. Later in autumn 2001, Sissel toured Scandinavia and sang at a memorial ceremony in October at Copenhagen Airport. Sissel then performed at a memorial concert for a 17-year-old boy, Benjamin Hermansen, the victim of a racially motivated murder in a suburb of Oslo. She also performed at an AIDS/HIV benefit concert in Kulturkirken Jakob, Oslo where she sang "Eg Ser". On 6 December, Sissel performed with the Oslo Gospel Choir in Washington, D.C., as part of Norwegian Visions 2001.

2002–2008: More international success, My Heart, Nordisk Vinternatt and Into Paradise
In 2002, Sissel recorded two duets, Ave Maria and Bist du bei mir (BWV 508), with Plácido Domingo in April for his Sacred Songs album, released in September of that year. On 24 May 2002, dressed in traditional Norwegian costume, Sissel performed the Norwegian psalm "Lær meg å kjenne" at the wedding of Princess Märtha Louise of Norway and Ari Behn in the Nidaros Cathedral. In August, Sissel performed with the Danish Radio Orchestra at two outdoor concerts in the park surrounding Ledreborg Castle near Roskilde in Denmark. In addition to the orchestra, Sissel entertained the sold-out crowd of 22,000 and guests on these concert were artists like Paddy Moloney and The Pilatze Brothers. On 1 October 2002, Sissel released her first album in the US. It sold over 100,000 copies in its first three months of release with hardly any advertising or marketing. The album sold better than Decca record executives expected, their initial goal having been to sell 100,000 copies in the first nine months. The album, titled Sissel, was largely a re-recording of songs from her Norwegian album, All Good Things with the addition of two songs, "Solitaire" and "Shenandoah". In late 2002, one of Sissel's concerts was filmed at the Oslo Spectrum and later broadcast in March 2003 on PBS in the United States. The British Singer Russell Watson was one of her guests. The production was subsequently released as the DVD Sissel in Concert. In December 2002, Sissel was again invited to represent Norway at the Nobel Peace Prize Concert, for which she sang "Somewhere Over The Rainbow" from The Wizard of Oz and "The Prayer" in a duet with Josh Groban. Sissel closed out 2002 by performing at a Christmas concert, Christmas in Moscow 2003, in Moscow, Russia with José Carreras, Plácido Domingo and Emma Shapplin. The show garnered mixed reviews from the Russian media, although Sissel received all-around high marks. This concert was broadcast on Russian television and in October 2014 this concert was released on CD.

In April 2003, Sissel performed in Tokyo, Japan and then in April–May she toured US, visiting Philadelphia, St. Louis and New York City. Sissel had a Poulsen rose (a rose engineered to thrive in cold Scandinavian winters) named after her on 10 August in Denmark. "She spreads joy among all of us with her wonderful voice" was the reasoning behind the honor, bestowed upon her in the garden of Haraldsted Church. Sissel performed The Rose, Vatnet, våren, fela and Solveig's Song during the presentation. Sissel sang with Swedish singer Peter Jöback on the Christmas single "Gå inte forbi" for his new holiday CD. Sissel also guested him on his Christmas tour in Sweden that year.

Sissel released her second US album, My Heart, in March 2004. It was a classical crossover album and included two pop songs written by Richard Marx and one ballad, "Wait A While", written by Jon Lord of Deep Purple. "My Heart" reached No. 3 on the Billboard Classical Album Chart after debuting at No. 7 and spent 31 weeks on the chart. In the summer and fall of 2004, Sissel went on tour with The Lord of the Rings Symphony. She was a featured soloist for an orchestral performance dedicated to the music from The Lord of the Rings films. The Lord of the Rings composer Howard Shore, who arranged and conducted the music, planned on hiring three soprano singers to handle the vocal chores, but after hearing Sissel, decided she would be enough. At each performance, Sissel performed with a symphony orchestra and choirs with 200 musicians on stage. Howard Shore stated, "Ancient Norwegian mythology and culture had a great influence on Tolkien's work. It is very thrilling to have the Norwegian singer Sissel perform as a soloist in The Lord of the Rings Symphony. Sissel's radiant voice illuminates this work." When asked about the tour in an interview, Sissel raved, "I love the music. It's such a wonderful feeling to be sitting in the middle of a symphony orchestra, surrounded by the beautiful voices of the choir and all those gorgeous melodies."

In May 2005, Sissel performed with the Mormon Tabernacle Choir in Salt Lake City, Utah, on their radio and TV broadcast, Music and the Spoken Word, which is featured on nearly 2,000 stations across the US and around the world. Sissel joined the choir to commemorate the Centennial of Norwegian Independence from Sweden, which was being celebrated that year. Sissel sang the ABBA song "Like An Angel Passing Through My Room", "Vitae Lux", the traditional Norwegian hymn "Herre gud, ditt dyre navn og ære", and the Norwegian national anthem, "Ja, vi elsker dette landet" (Yes, we love this country), with the choir. On 8 October 2005, King Harald of Norway knighted Sissel a Knight of the 1st Class in the Order of St. Olav for her contributions to music and as an ambassador for Norway. Sissel was 36 years old. The ceremony was held on 25 January on Hotel Bristol in Oslo. Same month Sissel was invited to perform on the well-known temple-concert, Ninna-ji Otobutai, in Osaka, Japan. She sang "Pie Jesu", "Sancta Maria" (intermezzo from Pietro Mascagni's opera Cavalleria Rusticana), "You Raise Me Up", and a couple of other songs. This concert was aired on television in Japan.

In December 2006, Sissel again joined the Mormon Tabernacle Choir as the featured soloist for their annual Christmas concerts. In four performances, she sang for more than 80,000 people in the 21,000-seat Conference center in Salt Lake City. The concerts were videotaped for PBS television and aired the year after, in December 2007. Sissel celebrated more than 20 years in the music industry with the release of a greatest hits album presenting 40 of her best and most well-known songs, including some never-before-released songs. She toured Norway in December with her Christmas concerts with a mix of Christmas carols and hits from her greatest hits-release that year.

In March 2007, a statistically representative sample of the Norwegian population chose her as the best female Norwegian musical artist in competition with 15 other big names, including Lene Marlin, Wenche Myhre, Kari Bremnes, and Bertine Zetlitz. In the summer of 2007, Sissel toured Norway, Sweden, France, and the US with a band. According to Sissel, this is a new concert format for her, without a choir. For the 2007 holiday season, PBS stations aired two concerts starring Sissel as part of the December pledge drive, one with the Mormon Tabernacle Choir titled Spirit of the Season, released on CD and DVD in late September 2007, the other with operatic legend and good friend José Carreras titled Northern Lights, released on CD and DVD in early November 2007. The albums of these concerts have proven to be extremely popular, with Northern Lights reaching No. 10 in the Billboard Classical Crossover list, and Spirit of the Season staying firmly planted at No.1 on the Billboard Classical charts for nine consecutive weeks.

The album Northern Lights is a live recording of a concert at Bergstadens Ziir ("Jewel of the mountain town" in German), a church from the 17th Century in Røros, Norway (a 17th-Century Germany mining town). It was inspired by Norway's winter, the Blue hour, and the mystical Northern Lights. The music were arranged by Kjetil Bjerkestrand and the musicians sharing the stage with Sissel were the Trondheim Soloists, the Nidaros Cathedral Girls Choir, and Sissel's own band. The concert featured the tenor José Carreras, which performed the Julio Iglesias/Dolly Parton-duet "When You Tell Me That You Love Me" with Sissel. Sissel conducted an eight-city US tour in February 2008, singing selections from Northern Lights. A second leg of the tour covered more cities in the central and southern United States and lasted through April.

2009–present: New influences and break from music, Strålande Jul and Til deg
On 9 November 2009, Sissel released a new Christmas album called Strålande Jul (Glorious Christmas), a project with Odd Nordstoga, another popular Norwegian singer. This album presents mostly lesser-known Christmas carols from Scandinavia. Sissel toured in both Norway and Sweden with Odd Nordstoga, The Real Group, Orsa spelmän, and Krister Henrikson. This album and their sold-out Christmas concerts received much critical acclaim in Norway and Sweden. The record company Universal Music anticipated sales of about 100,000 CDs, but ultimately sold more than 400,000 in Norway in the first two months.

In May 2010, Sissel visited China with the Trondheim Soloists, on Expo 2010 in Shanghai. They performed songs like "Jag vill alltid følja dig", "Solveig's Song" and "Wait A While". Part of these concerts were broadcast on Norwegian television in the summer of 2010. On 20 September 2010, an unauthorized biography of Sissel, named Sissel, by Stig Nilsson, was released in Norway. Nilsson had written several songs for Sissel earlier in her career. In the book, Nilsson claims—among other things—that Sissel never became a worldwide superstar because she did not want to be. The book has only been released in Norwegian. On 15 November 2010, Sissel released a new album in Scandinavia called Til deg (For You), recorded in ABBA's Polar Studios in Stockholm, Nidaros Studios in Trondheim, and in Nashville. This album shows a new direction in music and is heavily influenced by the style of country music, roots and folk. The album includes five songs sung in Swedish, three in Norwegian and two in English, including a Norwegian translation of Victoria Shaw's song "Never Alone", titled "Velkommen hjem", and a Swedish cover of Alison Krauss' song "Ghost in This House", called "Levande död". Sissel has collaborated with Mikael Wiehe, Espen Lind, and Py Bäckman on the new album.

In 2011 Sissel moved back to Norway after 22 years in Denmark. On 21 August 2011, Sissel performed the Norwegian hymn "Til ungdommen" by Nordahl Grieg at the National Memorial Ceremony for the victims of 22 July 2011 terrorist attacks. This ceremony took place in Oslo Spectrum and was broadcast live in all the Nordic countries. HM King Harald and HM Queen Sonja of Norway attended this ceremony with members from all the Nordic Royal Houses, and the prime ministers of Norway, Sweden, Denmark plus the presidents of Iceland and Finland. In September Sissel got her own stamp in Norway when a set of stamps of four Norwegian female performers was issued.

In December 2012 Sissel performed exclusively in two free Christmas-concerts in St John's Church, Bergen. This was the first time she performed a Christmas concert on her own in that church.

In November 2013 Sissel officially returned to the stage, after a 3-year long break. She appeared on the Norwegian talkshow "Lindmo", where she performed "My Tribute" by Andrae Crouch. Sissel toured Norway in November and December with her Christmas concerts with a new mix of Christmas- and gospel songs. She hired three gospel singers from New York to back her up on these concerts.

On 17 May 2014 Sissel performed the Norwegian national anthem "Ja, vi elsker dette landet" and Griegs "Våren" on the Norwegian Constitution Day 2014 on Eidsvoll, Norway. Royal guests from Norway, Sweden, and Denmark attended this ceremony which was broadcast live on television. Later, in September Sissel performed with the Greek tenor Mario Frangoulis at a concert on 5 September at the Odeon of Herodes Atticus in Greece. This concert, "Sing Me An Angel" was held in aid of the Non Profit Organisation "I Live For Me". They performed several duets like "You Raise Me Up", "Nights in White Satin", "Smile" and "What A Wonderful World". Sissel toured Norway and Sweden with her acclaimed Christmas concerts in November and December. In the fifth episode (of Season 3) of American television political drama series The Newsroom, which aired in December, a recording of Sissel singing "Shenandoah" was played over the death scene of Charlie Skinner (Sam Waterston).

In 2015 Sissel performed as vocal soloist at two Titanic Live-concerts in Lucerne, Switzerland on 13 and 14 March, and later at the Royal Albert Hall, London on 27 April, where Sissel performed the vocal lines of James Horner's orchestral score as well as the solo soprano for "My Heart Will Go On". A few weeks later James Horner died when his single-engine Tucano aircraft crashed in the Los Padres National Forest. In December 2015 Sissel was as one of nine names nominated for the 2016 Hall of Fame at Rockheim in Norway.

The beginning of 2016 saw Sissel performing at a TV-broadcast Royal Gala on 17 January, celebrating the 25th or silver jubilee of HM The King and HM The Queen of Norway's accession to the Norwegian throne. Sissel sang "For alltid" ("Forever"), written by Ole Paus. She toured Sweden in the fall, from 14–31 October with her new concert, Songs of Love. And in November/December she toured Norway, Denmark and Iceland with her Christmas concert, Sissel's jul. Sissel again was nominated in December for the 2017 Hall of Fame at Rockheim in Norway. And the 2014 PBS-concert, "Sing Me An Angel" with Mario Frangoulis was broadcast on television in the US from December.

In February 2017 Sissel performed at a TV-broadcast Celebration-concert for her friend, singer-songwriter Ole Paus in the Opera House in Oslo. And in November/December she toured Norway, Sweden, Denmark and Iceland with her Christmas concert success, Sissel's jul.

In May 2019 Sissel released the first of 50 new songs that came out each week for the following 50 weeks. This new project, named Reflections celebrated Sissel turning 50 years that year. On 6 June, Sissel performed together with Italian singer Andrea Bocelli at a concert in Oslo. In July, Sissel again was invited to perform with the Mormon Tabernacle Choir and the orchestra at Temple Square in their Pioneer Day concert, which also was broadcast on YouTube. And in August, Sissel made a special guest appearance on the popular Swedish TV-show Allsång på Skansen, where she performed two new songs, "Welcome to My World" and "Surrender".

Personal life
From 1993 to 2004, Kyrkjebø was married to her first husband Danish-American comedian and singer, Eddie Skoller. They have two daughters, Ingrid (born 1996) and Sarah (born 1999).

On 13 August 2013, Kyrkjebø married her second husband, Norwegian tax lawyer, Ernst Ravnaas, in a private ceremony in Hov church.

Discography

Unreleased/Rare/Unfinished/Performed songs by Sissel Kyrkjebø

Notable concerts and tours

Awards and recognition
 1986 – Årets spellemann (Musician of the Year) in the Spellemannprisen.
 1986 – Årets navn (Person of the Year) by Norwegian national newspaper Dagbladet.
 1986 – På gang-scholarship from Norwegian national newspaper VG, with Åge Aleksandersen
 1990 – Ansgarskolens Mediapris (Ansgarschool's Mediaprize), with Oslo Gospel Choir for the 1990 album Oslo Gospel Choir Live
 1992 – Klods Hans Prisen
 1993 – Gledespiken-prisen
 1995 – Paul Harris Fellow by Rotary International
 2002 – Ranked Scandinavia's Mostselling Artist with a total of 460 000 records sold on 18 months, with the albums In Symphony and Sissel
 2005 – UNICEF Goodwill Ambassador
 2005 – Knight of the 1st Class in the Order of St. Olav. On 8 October 2005, The King of Norway knighted Sissel for her contributions to music and as an ambassador for Norway. She was the youngest ever recipient of this honor.
 2006 – Juryens hederspris (Most Distinguished Artist—akin to a lifetime achievement award) in Spellemannprisen 2006. She is the youngest Norwegian performer ever to receive this award.
 2007 – Topp 10 – Beste kvinnelige artist Sissel was awarded Best Female Artist of Norway by the Norwegian public broadcasting company NRK in the TV program Topp 10 on 17 March 2007.
 2009 – A rose developed by Poulsen Roses is named after Sissel and she baptized the rose in Baroniet Rosendal on 4 August 2009.
 2010 – In February 2010 Sissel was nominated for the 40th Peer Gynt Award, which went to Dissimilis.
 2011 – On 16 September 2011, a set of stamps of four Norwegian female performers (Sissel Kyrkjebø, Wenche Myhre, Mari Boine and Inger Lise Rypdal) was issued.
 2011 – Rolf Gammleng-prisen (Open category)
 2015 – In December 2015 Sissel was nominated for the first time for the Rockheim Hall of Fame 2016.
 2016 – In December 2016 Sissel was nominated for the second time for the Rockheim Hall of Fame 2017.
 2018 – In December 2018 Sissel was nominated for the third time for the Rockheim Hall of Fame 2019.

See also
Sissel & Odd

References

External links

 
 Sissel Kyrkjebø on Instagram
 Sissel Kyrkjebø on Facebook
 

 
1969 births
Living people
Musicians from Bergen
Norwegian women singers
Norwegian Lutherans
Norwegian sopranos
Opera crossover singers
Norwegian-language singers
English-language singers from Norway
German-language singers
Italian-language singers
French-language singers
Latin-language singers
Spellemannprisen winners